Danko Filipović (born 3 October 1978) is a Serbian football defender.

References

External links
 
 Danko Filipović stats at utakmica.rs
 

1978 births
Living people
People from Gornji Milanovac
Association football defenders
Serbian footballers
FK Metalac Gornji Milanovac players
FK Budućnost Valjevo players
Serbian SuperLiga players